St. Francois Township is an inactive township in St. Francois County, in the U.S. state of Missouri.

St. Francois Township takes its name from the county in which it is located.

References

Townships in Missouri
Townships in St. Francois County, Missouri